Rappin' with the Ladies is the first album by dancehall artist and DJ Shabba Ranks, released in 1988. The album contains collaborations with J.C. Lodge and Deborahe Glasgow.

Track listing 
 "Telephone Love Deh Pon Mi Mind" – 6:14
 "Just Be Good to Me" – 6:26
 "Steady Man" – 5:36
 "Mr. Loverman" – 5:39
 "Hardcore Loving" – 6:03
 "Action Packed" – 6:40
 "Twice My Age" – 6:33
 "Don't Test Me" – 5:26
 "Just Be Good to Me" – 5:40 (CD only)
 "Looking for Action" – 5:49 (CD only)
 "Hardcore Loving" – 5:47 (CD only)

References

1988 debut albums
Shabba Ranks albums
VP Records albums